Grand World Scenic Park is a former amusement park located at Dongpu, Tianhe District on the outskirts of Guangzhou, Guangdong, China.

Description
The park covers a total area of 710,000 square meters.  The total investment in the park is about 56.7 million yuan. The park features replicas of global landmarks.

Closure
A few years after opening, visitor number declined and the park got into financial trouble. As of 2017, the park is rented by a wedding photography business, with most of the attractions being in disrepair.

Worker relations
Since 2005 four fights have been reported by Guangzhou police between the amusement park and Yongshida workers.  The disputes involve contracts, power supplies, and dormitories.  On April 7, 2009, 40 men rampaged through the park destroying equipment and attacking workers with fishing forks, sticks, knives, iron bars and guns.  Six security guards were hurt, including one who was shot.  Police arrested 13 people in connection with the attack and seized 16 suspects in Guangdong province.

See also
 Window of the World

References

External links

 Official site

Amusement parks in China
Defunct amusement parks
Buildings and structures in Guangzhou
Miniature parks
Tourist attractions in Guangzhou
Tianhe District
2005 establishments in China